Hannah Endicott-Douglas (born November 29, 1994) is a Canadian actress from Toronto, Ontario. She is primarily known for her role in the television movie series The Good Witch.

Career
Endicott-Douglas landed her first role at the age of nine in the 2004 television film Samantha: An American Girl Holiday. Her most notable roles are Young Anne Shirley in Anne of Green Gables: A New Beginning, Lori Russell on Good Witch and Ariel Peterson on Slasher.

Personal life
Endicott-Douglas is the younger sister of actress Vivien Endicott-Douglas.

Filmography

Awards and nominations

References

External links

1994 births
Living people
Canadian people of Scottish descent
Actresses from Toronto
21st-century Canadian actresses
Canadian film actresses
Canadian television actresses
Canadian voice actresses